Lycopus lucidus is a species of plant in the family Lamiaceae. The aerial parts (澤蘭, 泽兰 zélán) and the dried rhizomes (地筍, 地笋 dìsǔn) are used in traditional Chinese medicine, have a reputation for promoting blood circulation and energy (qi), and preventing water retention. They are said to have a "warming" property, and have a mild bittersweet flavor.

Lycopus lucidus is now recognised as a synonym of Lycopus asper and has been merged into that taxon.

References

 
 
 
 

lucidus
Plants described in 1848
Plants used in traditional Chinese medicine